Duliajan Girls' College, established in 1992, is a women's general degree college situated at Duliajan, in Dibrugarh district, Assam. This college is affiliated with the Dibrugarh University. This college offers bachelor's degree courses in arts.

References

Universities and colleges in Assam
Colleges affiliated to Dibrugarh University
Educational institutions established in 1992
1992 establishments in Assam